The 1986 Arkansas gubernatorial election was conducted on November 4, 1986, to elect the Governor of Arkansas.

Incumbent Democratic Governor Bill Clinton stood for re-election. He had been elected in 1982 and re-elected in 1984, and sought a third consecutive term and fourth overall (Clinton had been first elected in 1978). His opponent was former Republican Governor Frank D. White, who was seeking to return to the office he had defeated Clinton for in the 1980 election.

After Amendment 63 to the Arkansas state constitution took effect, the term for all Arkansas governors was extended from two years to four. The 1986 election was the first to take place since then, meaning whoever managed to win would become the first elected to a four-year term as Governor of Arkansas.

Clinton had defeated former Governor Orval Faubus for the Democratic nomination, while White defeated former Lieutenant Governor Maurice Britt in the Republican primary.

Democratic Primary 
Clinton won the Democratic primary with 60.58% of the vote against Orval Faubus with 33.5% and W. Dean Goldsby with 5.92%.

Results by County

Result 
Clinton won the election with almost 64% of the vote.

References

Gubernatorial
Bill Clinton
Arkansas
1986